Ioana Bălăceanu (born 11 July 2003) is a Romanian footballer who plays as a forward for Olimpia Cluj and the Romania women's national team.

Career
She made her debut for the Romania national team on 4 April 2019 against Malta, starting the match.

International goals

References

2001 births
Living people
Women's association football forwards
Romanian women's footballers
Romania women's international footballers